Tripetalocerinae is a subfamily of groundhoppers or pygmy grasshoppers. There are at least two genera and two described species, found in India, China, Indo-China and Malesia.

Genera
These two genera belong to the subfamily Tripetalocerinae:
 Tripetalocera Westwood, 1834
 Tripetaloceroides Storozhenko, 2013

References

Tetrigidae
Orthoptera subfamilies